Too Many Women, also known as Girl Trouble and Man Trap, is a 1942 American film directed by Bernard B. Ray.

Plot summary 

Unsure of their financial situation, Richard Sutton and Linda Pearson have postponed their plans to marry to when they have a steady income. To be able to turn down a job offer he doesn't like, he pretends to have inherited money from a relative. Problem arises as his grandmother hears of the inheritance and believes it is a particular wealthy uncle Woodrow in Brazil who has thrown in the towel, leaving his $3 Million to Richard. She is also unaware of Richard's engagement to Linda.

When Richard wants to take the grandmother out of her misconception, her doctor advises against it, saying the shock could cause her death. Believing her grandson is rich now, she starts campaigning for his engagement to young beautiful Gwenny Miller. Gwenny is the grandmother's ward.

Another wealthy young woman, Barbara Cartwright, tells Richard she has an idea of how he can solve his problems. Richard goes to visit Barbara, but is quite dozy after involuntarily taking sleeping pills. He falls asleep, and when he wakes up again, he is seemingly engaged to Barbara.

Outraged and jealous, Linda breaks off their engagement, and Richard goes on a bender to drown his sorrows. Again he is knocked out, and wakes up in the apartment of infamous playboy Chester Wannamaker. With him in the apartment is a chorus girl named Lorraine O'Reilly, who really is Chester's fiancé.

Both Barbara and Gwenny soon arrives to the apartment to confront him, and after that also Lorraine's brother. The brother believes Richard is Chester and uses a gun to threaten him into marrying his sister.

Later, Richard's grandmother and uncle arrive at the apartment, saving him from the wrath of the women and the brother, explaining to them that Richard is poor. Richard reconciles with Linda after explaining the whole misunderstanding.

Cast 
Neil Hamilton as Richard Sutton
June Lang as Gwenny Miller
Joyce Compton as Barbara Cartwright
Barbara Read as Linda Pearson
Fred Sherman as Charlie Blakewell
Marlo Dwyer as Lorraine O'Reilly
Kate MacKenna as Grandmother Sutton
Maurice Cass as Doctor Hamilton
Matt McHugh as Spike O'Reilly
Harry Holman as John Cartwright
George Davis as Bottles
Pat Gleason as Gibbons
Tom Herbert as W. R. Mitchell
Bertram Marburgh as Uncle Woodrow
Dora Clement as Mrs. Fairbanks

Soundtrack

External links

References

1942 films
1942 comedy films
American black-and-white films
Producers Releasing Corporation films
Films directed by Bernard B. Ray
American comedy films
1940s English-language films
1940s American films